Ustye Povalikhino is a rural locality (a village) in Tregubovskoye Rural Settlement, Velikoustyugsky District, Vologda Oblast, Russia. The population was 6 as of 2002. There are 2 streets.

Geography 
Ustye Povalikhino is located 22 km southwest of Veliky Ustyug (the district's administrative centre) by road. Skorodum is the nearest rural locality.

References 

Rural localities in Velikoustyugsky District